William Henry Young was a member of the Wisconsin State Assembly.

Biography
Young was born on August 11, 1845, in Woodville, Mississippi. He would move to St. Helena Parish, Louisiana in 1852. During the American Civil War, Young served with the 4th Wisconsin Volunteer Cavalry Regiment of the Union Army. Originally an enlisted man, he achieved the rank of first lieutenant.

Political career
Young was a member of the Assembly in 1885. Additionally, he was an alderman and Mayor of Oconto, Wisconsin. He was a Republican.

References

People from Woodville, Mississippi
People from St. Helena Parish, Louisiana
People from Oconto, Wisconsin
Republican Party members of the Wisconsin State Assembly
Mayors of places in Wisconsin
Wisconsin city council members
People of Wisconsin in the American Civil War
Union Army officers
Union Army soldiers
1845 births
Year of death missing